Deserticossus is a genus of moths in the family Cossidae.

Species
 Deserticossus arenicola (Staudinger, 1879)
 Deserticossus artemisiae (Chou et Hua, 1986)
 Deserticossus beketi (Yakovlev, 2004)
 Deserticossus campicola (Eversmann, 1854)
 Deserticossus churkini Yakovlev, 2006
 Deserticossus consobrinus (Pungeler, 1898)
 Deserticossus curdus Yakovlev, 2006
 Deserticossus danilevskyi Yakovlev, 2006
 Deserticossus decoratus Yakovlev, 2006
 Deserticossus janychar Yakovlev, 2006
 Deserticossus lukhtanovi Yakovlev, 2006
 Deserticossus mongoliana (Daniel, 1969)
 Deserticossus murinus (Rothschild, 1912)
 Deserticossus praeclarus (Pungeler, 1898)
 Deserticossus pullus (Chua, Chou, Fang & Chen, 1990)
 Deserticossus pulverulentus (Püngeler, 1898)
 Deserticossus sareptensis (Rothschild, 1912)
 Deserticossus tsingtauana (Bang-Haas, 1912)
 Deserticossus volgensis (Christoph, 1893)

References

Древоточцы (Lepidoptera: Cossidae) России
Ревизия древоточцев рода Holcocerus Staudinger, 1884 (s. l.)

External links
Natural History Museum Lepidoptera generic names catalog

Cossinae
Moth genera